Perry Warren (born July 28, 1963) is an American politician who has served in the Pennsylvania House of Representatives from the 31st district since 2017.

Committee assignments 

 Commerce
 Insurance
 Local Government
 Transportation

References

1963 births
Living people
Democratic Party members of the Pennsylvania House of Representatives
21st-century American politicians